Ludwig Philipp Carl Wilhelm Strecker (16 March 1853 – 19 December 1943) was a German businessman who owned the London-based music publishing house, Schott and Co., Limited.

Career 
Strecker was born to Ludwig Theodor Strecker, a lawyer, and Wilhelmina Friderika Caroline Conradine Franziska Bermann (maiden). At the age of ten, his father moved the family to Darmstadt. Strecker went on to earn a JD degree. He was not related to the decedent. The London publishing firm stayed in his family, passing to his four children, until 1980, when it merged back into B. Schott's Söhne of Mainz, Germany.

Inheritance of music publishing firm 
 (1811–1874) – the oldest son of Johann Andreas Schott (1781–1840), who was the oldest son of Bernhard Schott – was the managing director and sole proprietor of B. Schott's Söhne from 1855 until his death. Franz, who had no children, stipulated in his will that B. Schott's Söhne be distributed after the death of his wife, Betty de Braunrasch (1820–1875), as follows:

Strecker's career (continued) 
In Strecker, Sr.'s, role as head of B. Schott's Söhne, he was a publisher for Richard Wagner, who made challenging demands that frequently culminated in financial duress. Nonetheless, Strecker, Sr., in a succession of renegotiations for moderate compromises, after each, was able to compensate Wagner. B. Schott's Söhne published Siegfried Idyll (1877) and Parsifal (1882).

Strecker was involved in the Mainz Oratorio Society (de), currently known as the Mainzer Singing Adacemy – which has endured for  years. Strecker was its president for 25 years.

Awards 
  Awarded the title of Secret Commercial Council by Grand Duke Ernst Ludwig
  1909: He was appointed by Grand Duke Ernst Ludwig as a lifelong member of the first chamber of the Provinces of the Grand Duchy of Hesse (de), of which he was a member until the German Revolution of 1918–1919

Family 
Strecker – on March 9, 1883, in Darmstadt – married Elisabeth Merck (maiden; 1862–1947), the daughter of Georg Franz Merck (1825–1873), a Darmstadt entrepreneur, and Antoinette Wilhelmine Caroline Schenck (maiden; 1830–1908).  The couple had three sons and a daughter. When Ludwig Strecker, Sr., died in 1943, his oldest son, Ludwig Strecker Jr., took over the management of the publishing house with his second oldest son, Wilhelm as manager and director. Ludwig Strecker, Sr., is buried in the main cemetery in Mainz. Strecker, Sr.'s, third and youngest son, Paul Strecker (1898–1950) was an artist and writer who painted and designed sets for opera and theater.

References 
Inline citations

1853 births
1943 deaths
Music publishers (people)